Tales with misono -Best- (stylized as Tales with misono-BEST-) is Japanese artist misono's first greatest hits EP. The EP was a collection of the songs she performed for the Tales of... series both as a soloist and while she was the lead vocalist in the group day after tomorrow, which disbanded in mid-2005 following the release of a compilation album.

The EP charted well on Oricon, coming in at No. 21 and remaining on the charts for five weeks.

Information
Tales with misono -Best- is the first greatest hits EP by Japanese singer-songwriter misono. The EP charted well on the Oricon Albums Charts, taking No. 21 for the weekly ranking and remaining on the charts for five consecutive weeks.

The EP was released in two formats: a standard CD and a CD+DVD format. The CD portion contained all of the songs misono had performed for the Tales of series of role-playing video games, both as a soloist and as the lead vocalist during her time in the band day after tomorrow. The DVD, however, did not carry the music videos for any of the songs. Instead, the openings for each respective game were used in lieu of the promotional music videos.

Though the CD was made up primarily of previously released tracks, it did carry one new song written solely for the EP: "Tales...". Musically, the song was very reminiscent of the song "Starry Heavens," which misono performed with her band day after tomorrow for the opening video to the video game Tales of Symphonia. misono wrote the music for "Tales...", while Atsushi Sato, known as ats-, from the group HΛL performed the instrumentals.

While "Lovely♡Cat's Eye" was not used as an opening to one of the Tales of video games, it was used in promotional advertisements for Tales of the Tempest, of which "VS" was the theme song. The EP did not contain the single version, instead harboring the rendition that was placed on her studio album Never+Land, "Lovely♡Cat's Eye ~Neko wa Kotatsu de Maruku Naranai no Maki~."
 
For the album's cover, misono is drawn to be a character in the Tales of series, with Collette Brunel and Lloyd Irving from Tales of Symphonia in the background.

Track listing

Charts

Oricon sales chart

References

External links
Misono's Official Website

2009 EPs
Avex Group EPs
Japanese-language EPs